Pierre Gaveaux (6 October 1760 – 5 February 1825) was a French operatic tenor and composer, notable for creating the role of Jason in Cherubini's Médée and for composing Léonore, ou L’amour conjugal, the first operatic version of the story that later found fame as Fidelio.

Early life 

Gaveaux was born in Béziers and sang in the cathedral choir there from the age of seven.  Although intending to enter the priesthood, he also took lessons in composition.  He next became first tenor at the Basilica of Saint-Seurin in Bordeaux, studying with Franz Ignaz Beck, and subsequently decided to follow a career in music, becoming a conductor at the Grand Théâtre de Bordeaux as well as continuing to sing.

Career as a singer 

After a period in Montpellier, he moved to Paris where, on 26 January 1789, he took part in a performance of Giacomo Tritto's Le Avventure Amorose, which marked the inauguration of the Théâtre de Monsieur company in the Salle des Machines at the Tuileries Palace.

He subsequently performed with the company in operas such as Paisiello's L’Infante de Zamora (in 1789), and on 18 July 1791 he sang the role of Floresky in the première of Cherubini's Lodoïska. When the company moved to the Théâtre Feydeau, he was involved in a "folly in verse" called Le club des bonnes gens which was banned by the censor for being unpatriotic.

He was active during the revolutionary period, composing in 1792 a hymn to the Supreme Being.  On 19 January 1795, his famous anti-Jacobin song Le Réveil du peuple (The Awakening of the People), to words by Jean-Marie Souriguière de Saint-Marc, was first performed. Notwithstanding the banning of the song on 8 January 1796 by the Directoire, he continued his career in opera, appearing in François Devienne's Les visitandines, and creating the role of Jason in Cherubini's Médée on 13 March 1797.

Operas 

Gaveaux's first opera, L'amour filial (1792), was a success in Paris and was performed throughout Europe: Brussels, Cologne and Rotterdam in 1795, Bern and Moscow in 1809, Berlin and Hamburg (in a German translation) in 1796.

His most famous opera, Léonore, ou L’amour conjugal, premièred in 1798, with Gaveaux himself in the role of Florestan and Julie-Angélique Scio as Léonore.  It is best known today because the libretto (by Jean-Nicolas Bouilly) served as the basis for Beethoven's only opera, Fidelio.

Other operas by Gaveaux that were popular in their day include Sophie et Moncars, Le bouffe et le tailleur and Monsieur Des Chalumeaux, and in 1808 he composed L'échelle de soie to a translation of the libretto which Giuseppe Maria Foppa had written for Rossini's La scala di seta.

Chronological list of operas 
{|align=right
|{{Listen
|filename=Pierre Gaveaux - Polacca from the opera Le Trompeur Trompé.ogg
|title=Polacca from Le Trompeur Trompé (1800)
|description=From Le Trompeur Trompé. Montserrat Alvedra, soprano; William McColl, clarinet; Joseph Levine, fortepiano. Played on historical instruments.
}}
|}L'amour filial, 1792Le paria ou La chaumière indienne, 1792Les deux ermites, 1793La partie carrée, 1793La famille indigente, 1794Sophronime ou La reconnaissance, 1795Delmon et Nadine, 1795La gasconnade, 1795Le petit matelot ou Le mariage impromptu, 1796Lise et Colin ou La surveillance inutile, 1796Tout par hasard, 1796Céliane, 1796Le mannequin vivant ou Le mari de bois, 1796Le traité nul, 1797Sophie et Moncars ou L'intrigue portugaise, 1797Léonore, ou L’amour conjugal, 1798Le diable couleur de rose ou Le bonhomme misère, 1798Les noms supposés ou Les deux jockeys, 1798Le locataire, 1800Le trompeur trompé, 1800Ovinska ou Les exilés de Sibérie, 1801Le retour inattendu, 1802Un quart d'heure de silence, 1804Le bouffe et le tailleur, 1804Avis aux femmes ou Le mari colère, 1804Trop tôt ou Le projet manqué, 1804Le mariage inattendu, 1804Le diable en vacances ou La suite du diable couleur de rose, 1805L'amour à Cythère, 1805Monsieur Des Chalumeaux, 1806L'échelle de soie, 1808La rose blanche et la rose rouge, 1809L'enfant prodigue, 1811Pygmalion, 1816Une nuit au bois ou Le muet de circonstance, 1818

 Later life 

Gaveaux continued to sing until 1812, although after the company of the Théâtre Feydeau merged with that of the Théâtre Favart in 1801, his voice was in decline and he only performed secondary roles.  In 1819 he entered the asylum at Charenton on the outskirts of Paris, where he died.  His wife, Émilie Gavaudan (also a singer), died in 1840.

 References 

 Fétis, François-Joseph (1862). Biographie universelle des musiciens et bibliographie générale de la musique, 2nd edition, vol. 3, pp. 428–429. Paris: Didot. View at Google Books.
 Letailleur, Paulette (1992). "Gaveaux [Gavaux, Gaveau], Pierre" in Sadie 1992, vol. 2, pp. 362–363.
 Sadie, Stanley, editor (1992). The New Grove Dictionary of Opera'' (4 volumes). London: Macmillan. .

External links 
 

1761 births
1825 deaths
People from Béziers
French male classical composers
French opera composers
18th-century French composers
Male opera composers
French operatic tenors
Burials at Père Lachaise Cemetery
18th-century French male opera singers
19th-century French male opera singers